The Bulgarian Academy of Sciences and Arts (BANI) is a learned academy, registered in Haskovo, Bulgaria.

History
The academy was founded in 2004 as non-profit-making non-governmental organisation.

References
 History. Bulgarian Academy of Sciences and Arts. Accessed May 2015.
 Statute. Bulgarian Academy of Sciences and Arts. Accessed May 2015.

External links
 Celokupna Bulgaria (in Bulgarian). Newspaper issued by BASA

Scientific organizations based in Bulgaria
Arts organizations based in Bulgaria
National academies
Haskovo